New Hampshire Route 107 is a  north–south state highway in eastern New Hampshire. It connects Laconia in the Lakes Region with Seabrook on the Atlantic coast. The southern terminus of NH 107 is at U.S. Route 1 in Seabrook near the entrance to Seabrook Station Nuclear Power Plant. The northern terminus is at U.S. Route 3 on the Laconia/Gilford town line.

The highway is signed north-south, but follows a more southeast-to-northwest alignment. Although the route stretches for almost , NH 107 essentially exists as a series of smaller segments connected by short concurrencies with other routes.

NH 107 between US 3 and Leavitt Road in Laconia is part of the Timberman 70.3 Triathlon bicycle course.

Route description

Seabrook to Kingston 
The highway interchanges with Interstate 95  to the west then continues west into the town of Kensington. NH 107 crosses NH 150 and traverses the southern part of Kensington before continuing into East Kingston where it meets NH 108. NH 108 turns onto NH 107, sharing pavement briefly before splitting off to the south. Continuing west into Kingston, NH 107 intersects the northern terminus of NH 107A (its only "child" route) before meeting NH 111 and NH 125. NH 107 continues along NH 125 for another  before it splits off on its own again.

Kingston to Northwood 
NH 107 cuts across the southwestern corner of Brentwood, then crosses the Exeter River into Fremont and intersects with NH 111A. The two routes overlap for  before NH 111A splits off to the south. NH 107 continues along the river until crossing into Raymond. The highway intersects the eastern terminus of NH 102 before turning due north. NH 107 crosses the Lamprey River and interchanges with NH 101 before intersecting with NH 27 east of downtown. NH 107 turns west onto NH 27, and NH 156, a short connector to Nottingham, splits off to the north. NH 27 and NH 107 continue along the Lamprey River for  before splitting in the western end of town. NH 107 turns north to continue along the Lamprey River into the town of Deerfield, where it intersects with NH 43. The highway continues northwest into Epsom where it intersects with US 4, US 202 and NH 9 in the eastern end of town. NH 107 splits off and continues northwest into Pittsfield.

Pittsfield to Belmont 
NH 107 crosses the town of Pittsfield through windy, hilly terrain before reaching the downtown area. In downtown Pittsfield, the highway turns north and crosses NH 28 before continuing north and crossing into the town of Barnstead. The highway runs briefly through the western corner of the town before continuing northwest into Gilmanton, where it meets the eastern terminus of NH 129, a connector to Loudon to the southwest. NH 107 continues northwest through more hilly terrain for several miles, then crosses NH 140 in the town center. Continuing north, NH 107 traverses the eastern corner of Belmont before entering the city of Laconia.

Laconia 
NH 107 has a partial interchange with the Gilford-Laconia Bypass (US 3 / NH 11); full access is available via NH 106  to the north. NH 107 joins NH 106 northbound into downtown Laconia via South Main Street. NH 106 and NH 107 intersect with NH 11A (unsigned US 3 Business) in the city's center, near the Winnipesaukee River. NH 107 (and US 3 Business) continue north on Union Avenue, paralleling Opechee and Paugus bays before reaching its northern terminus at US 3 (Lake Street/Lake Shore Road) at the Laconia/Gilford line (US 3 Business also ends here).

History
From Laconia to Barnstead, Route 107 is part of the Old Province Road, the first "farm to market" road in New Hampshire. Province Road was planned in 1763 to divert crops from being shipped down the Connecticut River from the Haverhill area, then called "Little Co-os", and instead have them brought to the Durham area. Province Road began the great era of roadbuilding in New Hampshire, a dream of Governor John Wentworth, which had to wait until the end of the French and Indian Wars.

Major intersections

Concurrent routes 
 New Hampshire Route 108:  , East Kingston
 New Hampshire Route 111:  , Kingston
 New Hampshire Route 125:  , Kingston
 New Hampshire Route 111A:  , Fremont
 New Hampshire Route 27:  , Raymond
 New Hampshire Route 43:  , Deerfield
 U.S. Route 4 / U.S. Route 202 / New Hampshire Route 9:  , Epsom to Northwood
 New Hampshire Route 106:  , Laconia
 New Hampshire Route 11A:  , Laconia
 U.S. Route 3 Business (unsigned):  , Laconia

Suffixed routes

The southern terminus of the route is at the Massachusetts state line in South Hampton, where South Hampton Road continues unnumbered into Amesbury, Massachusetts. The northern terminus is at NH 107 in Kingston.

NH 107A begins at the Massachusetts border in South Hampton as Main Avenue. The road progresses to the northwest, becoming Burnt Swamp Road at the town line. The name remains the same to an intersection with NH 108, where NH 107A becomes Powwow River Road. In Kingston NH 107A turns to the north a short distance ahead of its northern terminus at NH 107, a few yards east of the junction of NH 107 and NH 111 / NH 125.

References

External links 

 New Hampshire State Route 107 on Flickr
 New Hampshire State Route 107A on Flickr

107
Transportation in Rockingham County, New Hampshire
Transportation in Merrimack County, New Hampshire
Transportation in Belknap County, New Hampshire